Tarbagatai, Tarbagatay or Tarvagatai may refer to:

Tarbagatai Mountains in the north-western parts of Xinjiang, China and East Kazakhstan
 Tarvagatai, a sub-range of the Khangai massif, Khövsgöl Province, Mongolia
Tarvagatai River, in the Teshig sum of Bulgan aimag in Mongolia
Tacheng Prefecture or Tarbagatai, a prefecture in the Ili Kazakh autonomous prefecture, Xinjiang, China
Tacheng, sometimes Tarbagatai, in northern Ili Kazakh autonomous prefecture, Xinjiang, China
Tarbagatay, Russia, the name of several inhabited localities in Russia
Tarbagatay District, a district of East Kazakhstan Region, Kazakhstan

See also
Tarbagataysky District, a district of the Buryat Republic, Russia